Matra Marconi Space (MMS) was a Franco-British aerospace company.

History 
Matra Marconi Space was established in 1990 as a joint venture between the space and telecommunication divisions of the Lagardère Group (Matra Espace) and the GEC group (Marconi Space Systems). The merged company was announced in December 1989 and was owned 51% by Matra and 49% by GEC-Marconi. It would have annual sales of £300 million, with £8.7 million in assets from Marconi Space Systems and £10.7 million in assets from Matra Espace.

Claude Goumy, the Managing Director of Matra Espace was the first Managing Director. The first deputy Managing Director was Richard Wignall, the former Managing Director of Marconi Space Systems. The space industry was important to France - almost half the budget of the European Space Agency (ESA) came from the French government.

Acquisitions 
In 1991, British Aerospace was discussing with MMS how to merge their space interests, as well as Robert Bosch GmbH and Deutsche Aerospace.

On 19 July 1994, it acquired British Aerospace Space Systems (a subsidiary of BAe Dynamics with 900 workers) for £56 million. On 11 August 1994, it bought Ferranti Satcomms (from administration), which was based in Poynton in Cheshire. Ferranti Satcomms brought satellite ground station, component and subsystem technologies to the group.

In July 1995, GEC bought 45% of shares in the National Remote Sensing Centre for the company. Also in July 1995, the company was looking to link up with Aérospatiale of Toulouse and DASA of Germany to form a Europe-wide space company. The company would (five years later) link up with DASA.

By 1996, the company was turning over more than £1 billion. In the late 1990s, it developed a partnership with the University of Sheffield's Sheffield Centre for Earth Observation Science (SCEOS), which researched interferometry.

In November 1997, it announced that it would close the Filton site (former BAe Dynamics) in August 1999, with the planned transfer of 300 of 400 personnel and staff from Bristol to Stevenage. The Filton site specialised in scientific satellites and their computer software; projects included Ulysses, Hubble Space Telescope Solar Arrays, Giotto, Envisat / Polar Platform, Solar and Heliospheric Observatory (SoHO) and the Cluster spacecraft destroyed in the first flight of Ariane 5. Over 380 staff left the Company and as a result, MMS lost the ESA prime contract for the Rosetta spacecraft. British Aerospace regained an interest in the company when it merged with GEC's Marconi Electronic Systems to form BAE Systems in November 1999.

Astrium 
In late 1998, it was discussing a possible merger with DaimlerChrysler Aerospace AG (DASA).
In 2000, it was merged with the space division of DASA to form Astrium.

Management 
 Jean-Bernard Lévy (1993-1994)
 Roger Wood (1994-1996)

Products 
 Skylark (rocket), sounding rocket designed earlier in the 1960s, last launched on 2 May 2005 (its 441st flight - Maser 10) from the Esrange site of the Swedish Space Corporation
 Radar for the European Remote-Sensing Satellite (ERS-1)
 Altitude and orbit-control system for XMM-Newton, which was launched on 10 December 1999
 Advanced synthetic aperture radar (ASAR) on the Envisat
 Propulsion systems (built at Filton) for four Cluster satellites, which were destroyed on 4 June 1996 on the Ariane 5G, Flight 501
 Technologies for Artemis satellite

Satellites 
 Ariel 6
 AfriStar, constructed with Alcatel Space
 AsiaStar, constructed with Alcatel Space
 Hélios (Europe's first) spy satellite
 Hipparcos, constructed with Alenia Spazio
 Hot Bird 2, the largest satellite made in Europe at the time and launched in November 1996, and other later Hot Bird satellites for Eutelsat
 Humidity Sounder for Brazil - launched in May 2002
 Early Inmarsat satellites
 Nilesat 101 - launched in April 1998, for ERTU
 Nilesat 102 - launched in August 2000
 Skynet satellite
 Solar and Heliospheric Observatory (SoHo) - launched on 2 December 1995
 Three satellites for 1worldspace, launched in 1999

See also 

 Matra BAe Dynamics, related missile company
 GEC Alsthom, another GEC Anglo-French company

References 

Manufacturing companies based in Toulouse
Defence companies of France
Defence companies of the United Kingdom
Defunct technology companies of the United Kingdom
Defunct technology companies of France
Defunct manufacturing companies of the United Kingdom
Defunct manufacturing companies of France
Electronics companies of France
Electronics companies of the United Kingdom
France–United Kingdom relations
General Electric Company
Guglielmo Marconi
Matra
Space programme of the United Kingdom
Spacecraft manufacturers
Technology companies established in 1996
Technology companies disestablished in 2000
1996 establishments in France
1996 establishments in the United Kingdom
2000 disestablishments in the United Kingdom
British companies disestablished in 2000
British companies established in 1996
French companies established in 1996
French companies disestablished in 2000